Bukit Sentosa is a township in the district of Hulu Selangor. It is accessible from the North–South Expressway via Bukit Beruntung interchange exit 118 and Sungai Choh and Rasa via Federal Route 1.

See also
 Bukit Beruntung

References

https://web.archive.org/web/20140907191511/http://www2.nst.com.my/streets/central/bukit-beruntung-so-far-so-good-in-bukit-sentosa-1.367187

Townships in Selangor